Sylwester Arkadiusz Chruszcz (born 22 August 1972, in Głogów) is a Polish politician and Member of the European Parliament (MEP) for the Lower Silesian Voivodship and Opole Voivodship with the Naprzód Polsko, part of the Union for Europe of the Nations  and is member of the European Parliament's Committee on Transport and Tourism.

Chruszcz is a substitute for the Committee on Regional Development and a member of the Delegation for relations with Canada.

After the 2007 parliamentary election, when Liga lost all its seats in the Sejm and the Senat, its leader Roman Giertych resigned and announced his withdrawal from policy. Chruszcz was named acting leader.

Education
 1997: Master's in Architectural Engineering

Career
 1999-2004: Architect in the 'E & L Architects' design studio in Warsaw (1997 - 1999), architect in the 'CH 2 Architects' design studio in Szczecin
 Vice-Chairman of the board of the League of Polish Families (2004 - )

See also
 2004 European Parliament election in Poland

External links
 
 
 

1972 births
Living people
People from Głogów
League of Polish Families MEPs
MEPs for Poland 2004–2009